Las Vegas station is an Amtrak train station at Railroad Avenue and Lincoln Street in Las Vegas, New Mexico. Built in 1899, the two-story brick station building was designed in the Spanish Mission style and features a red tile roof, ornate metal brackets and a curving parapet. The station was renovated in 2000, when approximately $1.2 million was secured from federal, state and private sources. It reopened as the Las Vegas Intermodal Facility and now houses a passenger waiting room and the city's Visitor Center.

The station is near the Castañeda Hotel, a former hotel built by Fred Harvey for the Atchison, Topeka and Santa Fe Railway.  The hotel's architects were Frederick Roehrig and A. Reinsch.  The hotel is the oldest Mission Revival Style building in the state of New Mexico, opening for business on January 17, 1899.

The station and former hotel are contributing properties to the Railroad Avenue Historic District.

Routes 
Southwest Chief

See also 
List of Amtrak stations

Bibliography

References

External links 

Las Vegas Amtrak Station (USA Rail Guide -- TrainWeb)

Amtrak stations in New Mexico
Atchison, Topeka and Santa Fe Railway stations in New Mexico
Railway stations in the United States opened in 1879
Buildings and structures in San Miguel County, New Mexico
Transportation in San Miguel County, New Mexico
Las Vegas, New Mexico
Mission Revival architecture in New Mexico
1879 establishments in New Mexico Territory